The 1975 Asian Women's Volleyball Championship was the inaugural edition of the Asian Championship, a quadrennial international volleyball tournament organised by the Asian Volleyball Confederation (AVC) with Australian Volleyball Federation (AVF). The tournament was held in Melbourne, Australia from 17 to 28 August 1975.

Results

|}

|}

Final standing

References
Results(  2009-05-05)

V
Asian Women's
Asian women's volleyball championships
Volleyball